Khunik-e Bala (also Romanized as Khūnīk-e Bālā and Khūnīk Bālā; also known as Khānaq-e Bālā, Khānaq-i-Bāla, and Khānaq) is a village in Qaen Rural District, in the Central District of Qaen County, South Khorasan Province, Iran. At the 2006 census, its population was 74, in 20 families.

References 

Populated places in Qaen County